The expression rice Christian is a term used to describe someone who has formally converted to Christianity for material benefits rather than for religious reasons. Merriam-Webster dictionary defines it as "a convert to Christianity who accepts baptism not on the basis of personal conviction but out of a desire for food, medical services, or other benefits".

Similarly, in India, the term rice bag or rice bag convert is used as a derogatory slur targeting Christians, alleging that the target had converted to Christianity for a bag of rice. The term is often used by right-wing Hindutva groups in India.

Concerns have been expressed both by Christian missionaries and by those opposed to Christian missions that people in these situations are only nominally converting to Christianity in order to receive charity or material advancements.

History 
One of the earliest examples of this concept in English appeared in 1689 with the writings of William Dampier when he wrote regarding the French priests' effort to convert people of Tonkin that "alms of rice have converted more than their preaching."

This term and the topic were very extensively written about by Thomas Hale, Jr. He introduced the topic in his first 1986 book Don't Let the Goats Eat the Loquat Trees and spoke and taught on best practices in missions summarizing his work in his 1995 book On Being a Missionary. The term has also been used pejoratively to describe conversions by missionaries who exploit poverty and famine, where food and other allurements are given in exchange for conversion. In Christian Witness in a Multi-Religious World: Recommendations for Conduct, a document issued by the World Council of Churches in 2011, one of the points raised states "If Christians engage in inappropriate methods of exercising mission by resorting to deception and coercive means, they betray the gospel and may cause suffering to others." Principles 4 and 5 of this document outline that "Acts of service, such as providing education, health care, relief services and acts of justice and advocacy are an integral part of witnessing to the gospel. The exploitation of situations of poverty and need has no place in Christian outreach. Christians should denounce and refrain from offering all forms of allurements, including financial incentives and rewards, in their acts of service...as they carry out these ministries, fully respecting human dignity and ensuring that the vulnerability of people and their need for healing are not exploited." These admonitions are seen as to prevent false conversions which produce such rice Christians.

See also

Religion of the Yellow Stick
Christianity in Asia
Mission (Christian)
Souperism

References

Christian terminology
Conversion to Christianity
Religious slurs for people
Religious conversion in India
Food politics
English phrases